This is a list of diaries notable for their exceptional length, primarily by word count but also duration.

References 

Diaries
Longest things